Stimulant maintenance is the medical practice of prescribing stimulant substances such as cocaine or amphetamines to people who are dependent on these drugs. Supporters of stimulant maintenance believe that prescription offers legal alternatives to people who would otherwise be purchasing impure drugs in unknown potency and concentration, unnecessarily risking their health and supporting an illegal market that fuels organized crime. Pharmaceutical Dexedrine is being tried as drug replacement therapy for cocaine as well. There has been success in Australia and England.

References

Drug rehabilitation
Substance dependence